Arianne Phillips (born April 26, 1963) is an American costume designer. Phillips was recognized for her work on the Broadway musical Hedwig and the Angry Inch, starring Neil Patrick Harris, earning her a Tony award nomination for Best Costume Design. Phillips has a long-standing relationship with Madonna, with collaborations including photos shoots, music videos and designing tour costumes for six world tours over the past two decades. She has been nominated for the Academy Award for Best Costume Design three times, for James Mangold's Walk the Line (2005), Madonna's directorial debut, W.E. (2011), and for Quentin Tarantino's Once Upon a Time in Hollywood (2019). Phillips has also received a two BAFTA Award nominations for Tom Ford’s A Single Man (2009) and Quentin Tarantino's Once Upon a Time in Hollywood.

Her film career also includes Tom Ford's Nocturnal Animals (2016), Matthew Vaughn’s Kingsman: The Secret Service (2014) and Kingsman: The Golden Circle (2017), James Mangold’s Girl, Interrupted (1999) and 3:10 to Yuma (2007), John Cameron Mitchell’s Hedwig And the Angry Inch (2001), Mark Romanek’s One Hour Photo (2002), and Milos Forman’s The People Vs. Larry Flynt (1996).

In between film and music projects, Phillips works as a freelance fashion editor and stylist, collaborating with photographers for publications such as Italian Vogue, V Magazine, Harper’s Bazaar, German & Spanish Vogue and W Magazine. She continuously challenges herself by taking on projects that explore new expressions of her creativity. In 2018, she made her New York City Metropolitan opera debut, designing Nico Muhly’s opera, Marnie.

Miuccia Prada selected Phillips for her Iconoclasts project; to curate installations for the brands flagship stores in London and Beijing which included a short fashion film for the brand, which Phillips wrote and directed, called Passages. Her friend Alessandro Michele Creative Director of GUCCI commissioned her to create content for a special issue of A Magazine he guest edited and to style a brand film directed by Gia Coppola. She has also collaborated on special projects with Van Cleef and Arpels, Cartier, Valentino and Swarovski. Phillips was an inaugural member of the TIMES UP coalition and was asked by Reese Witherspoon to design its logo.

Early life and career
Phillips was raised in northern California and began making fashion sketches as a child. She relocated to New York in the early 1980s where she began working as an assistant stylist. She was initially recognized for helping to style Lenny Kravitz for his debut album, Let Love Rule.

Film credits

Television credits

Stage credits 
Hedwig and the Angry Inch, Broadway Musical  (2014)
Marnie, Opera (2017)
Head Over Heels, Broadway Musical  (2018)

Accolades

References

External links

Living people
American costume designers
1963 births
Artists from New York City
Women costume designers